Jess is a unisex given name, often a short form (hypocorism) of Jessica, Jesse, Jessie, etc., and a surname. It may refer to:

Given name
 Jess Atkinson (born 1961), American football player
 Jess Cain (1926–2008), American radio host
 Jess Cates (born 1976), American songwriter
 Jess Collins (1923–2004), American visual artist
 Jess Conrad (born 1936), British actor
 Jess H. Dickinson (born 1947), American judge
 Jess E. DuBois (born 1934), American painter
 Jess Folley (born 2003), English singer
 Jess Glynne (born 1989), English singer and songwriter
 Jess Hahn (1921–1998), American actor
 Jess Harnell (born 1963), American voice actor
 Jess Hartley (born 1967), American writer
 Jess Herbst (born 1958), American politician 
 Jess Hill (1907–1993), American athlete and coach
Jess Hill, Australian investigative reporter and author
 Jess Stonestreet Jackson, Jr. (1930–2011), American wine entrepreneur
 Jess Klein (born 1974), American singer/songwriter
 Jess Liaudin (born 1973), French mixed martial artist
 Jess Lee (Canadian singer), Canadian country music singer
 Jess Lee (Malaysian singer) (born 1988)
 Jess Margera (born 1978), American drummer
 Jess McMahon (1882–1954), American professional wrestling and professional boxing promoter, patriarch of the McMahon family of businesspeople and promoters
 Jess Mortensen (1907–1962), American multi-sport college athlete and track-and-field coach
 Jess Mowry (born 1960), American author
 Jess Nevins (born 1966), American author 
 Jess Oppenheimer (1913–1988), American television writer
 Jess Phillips (disambiguation)
 Jess J. Present (1921–1998), American politician
 Jess Richardson (1930–1975), American football player
 Jess Robbins (1886–1973), American film director
 Jess Roden (born 1947), British musician
 Jess Roskelley (1982–2019), American mountaineer
 Jess Row (born 1974), American writer
 Jess Stacy (1904–1995), American jazz pianist
 Jess Stearn (1914–2002), American journalist and author
 Jess Thomas (1927–1993), American opera singer
 Jess Thorup (born 1970), Danish former footballer
 Jess Vanstrattan (born 1982), Australian soccer player
 Jess von der Ahe (born 1966), American artist
 Jess Walter (born 1965), American author
 Jess Walton (born 1949), American actress
 Jess Weixler (born 1981), American actress
 Jess Willard (1881–1968), American boxer
 Jess Winfield (born 1961), American writer
 Jess Yates (1918–1993), British television presenter

Surname
 Carl Jess (1884–1948), Australian Army lieutenant general
 Eoin Jess (born 1970), Scottish former footballer
 Jim Jess (born 1955), retired Australian rules football player
 John Jess (1922–2003), Australian politician
 Matt Jess (born 1984), English rugby union player
 Tyehimba Jess (born 1965), American poet
 Walter Jess (born 1942), Canadian politician

Fictional characters
 Jess Bhamra, in the 2002 film Bend It Like Beckham
 Jess Bradley, the confidant/protégé/lover/scapegoat of James Stillwell in the comic book series The Boys
 Jess Mariano, in the television series Gilmore Girls
 Jess (Misfits), in the British television series Misfits
 Jess (New Girl), the eponymous New Girl on the FOX sitcom. 
 Jess Riley, playable character in the survival horror game Until Dawn
 Jess Squirrel, in the Redwall novels by Brian Jacques
 Jess Tamblyn, in the Saga of Seven Suns novels by Kevin J. Anderson
 Jess Warner, in the Australian soap opera Wentworth
 Jess the cat, in the Postman Pat universe
 Jess(e) in the video game Minecraft: Story Mode

See also
 Jes (disambiguation)
 Jesus (name)
 Jess (programming_language)

Hypocorisms
English masculine given names
English feminine given names
English unisex given names
Surnames from given names